A foghorn is a navigation aid at sea.

Foghorn may also refer to:

 "The Fog Horn", a 1951 science-fiction short story by Ray Bradbury
 "The Foghorn", a 1933 semi-horrific short story by Gertrude Atherton
 Foghorn Leghorn, a cartoon rooster that appears in the Looney Tunes and Merrie Melodies series
 Foghorn (film), a 1952 Japanese drama film
 "Foghorn", song by A from How Ace Are Buildings